Vitória do Jari, (Jari's Victory) is a municipality located in the southernmost tip of the state of Amapá in Brazil. Vitória do Jari has a population density of 5.9 inhabitants per square kilometer. The town is located on the Jari River on the other side of Munguba, and was originally called Beiradinho.

History

The town started as a shanty town for the Jari project. It was originally called Beiradinho. People in the informal economy who worked in Munguba could not afford housing in the Munguba or Monte Dourado. In 1994, the town was renamed Vitória do Jari and became an independent municipality.

Nature
The municipality contains 17% of the  Rio Cajari Extractive Reserve, created in 1990.

Economy
The economy is based on agricultural with an emphasis on corn, bananas, and watermelons, and cattle and buffalo ranches. CADAM, a kaolin mining company is a major employer in the region.

Jarilândia

Jarilândia is the location where Gmelina arborea was planted on a large scale for the pulp industry as part of the Jari project. In 1969, planting began, but soon the trees failed to grow. The project was cancelled in 1982.

References

External links
 Official site (in Portuguese)
 

1994 establishments in Brazil
Municipalities in Amapá
Populated places in Amapá
Populated places established in 1994
Squatting in Brazil